The San Ignacio de Loyola Parish Church (Spanish: Iglesia Parroquial de San Ignacio de Loyola), commonly known as Capul Church or Fuerza de Capul, is a Roman Catholic fortress church in the municipality of Capul, Northern Samar, Philippines within the jurisdiction of the Diocese of Catarman. It was first established as a mission station by the Jesuits in 1596 under the advocacy of Saint Ignatius of Loyola.

The church was declared a National Cultural Treasure by the National Museum of the Philippines.

History 
Capul was first established as a mission station by the Jesuits in 1596. The first church made of nipa and hardwood was dedicated to Saint Ignatius of Loyola. Moro attacks from the Pacific Ocean destroyed the church. A new church made of stone, along with a fortress, was built to protect the town from Moro invasion in the 1600s. Father Juan Isandi, last Jesuit priest to Capul, died during the Moro attacks in 1768. After the Jesuits were expelled in the country, the Franciscans later supervised Capul in 1768 with Father Joaquín Martínez as the first Franciscan priest there. On 8 November 1864, Capul was elevated as a parish by the Bishop of Cebu.

Architecture
The church is an example of a Spanish fortress church. It is surrounded by strong stone walls and bastions of dissimilar designs. Father Valero designed the church with a cross-shaped wall made of stone, similar to Intramuros. When Moro attacked the town, the people of Capul would take refuge inside the church. The bell tower is located on the left side of the church. A stone watchtower on a huge rock is located near the church complex. A small chapel, probably a mortuary chapel, can also be found inside the complex.

Its facade is simple as it forms a defensive wall. Pilasters and a split pediment around the central door only adorn the facade.

A typhoon destroyed the church's neo-gothic altar in 1947 and in 1987, another typhoon caused extensive damage when it ripped off the roof and ceiling. The church was afterwards repaired but is virtually an empty shell. The storm also destroyed the church's convent.

Historical and cultural declarations 
A historical marker was installed to Capul Church on 5 August 2011. It was also declared a National Cultural Treasure by the National Museum of the Philippines in 2014.

Notes

References 

Fortified church buildings
Roman Catholic churches in Northern Samar
Marked Historical Structures of the Philippines
National Cultural Treasures of the Philippines
Spanish Colonial architecture in the Philippines